__notoc__
Montague grammar is an approach to natural language semantics, named after American logician Richard Montague. The Montague grammar is based on mathematical logic, especially higher-order predicate logic and lambda calculus, and makes use of the notions of intensional logic, via Kripke models. Montague pioneered this approach in the 1960s and early 1970s.

Overview
Montague's thesis was that natural languages (like English) and formal languages (like programming languages) can be treated in the same way:
There is in my opinion no important theoretical difference between natural languages and the artificial languages of logicians; indeed, I consider it possible to comprehend the syntax and semantics of both kinds of language within a single natural and mathematically precise theory. On this point I differ from a number of philosophers, but agree, I believe, with Chomsky and his associates. ("Universal Grammar" 1970)

Montague published what soon became known as Montague grammar in three papers:
 1970: "Universal grammar" (= UG)
 1970: "English as a Formal Language" (= EFL)
 1973: "The Proper Treatment of Quantification in Ordinary English" (= PTQ)

Illustration

Montague grammar can represent the meanings of quite complex sentences
compactly. Below is a grammar presented in Eijck and Unger's textbook.

The types of the syntactic categories in the grammar are as follows, with t
denoting a term (a reference to an entity) and f denoting a formula.

The meaning of a sentence obtained by the rule  is obtained by
applying the function for NP to the function for VP.

The types of VP and NP might appear unintuitive because of the question as to the meaning of a noun phrase that is not simply a term. This is because meanings of many noun phrases, such as "the man who whistles", are not just terms in predicate logic, but also include a predicate for the activity, like "whistles", which cannot be represented in the term (consisting of constant and function symbols but not of predicates). So we need some term, for example x, and a formula whistles(x) to refer to the man who whistles. The meaning of verb phrases VP can be expressed with that term, for example stating that a particular x satisfies sleeps(x)  snores(x) (expressed as a function from x to that formula). Now the function associated with NP takes that kind of function and combines it with the formulas needed to express the meaning of the noun phrase. This particular way of stating NP and VP is not the only possible one.

Key is the meaning of an expression is obtained as a function of its components, either by function application (indicated by boldface parentheses enclosing function and argument) or by constructing a new function from the functions associated with the component. This compositionality makes it possible to assign meanings reliably to arbitrarily complex sentence structures, with auxiliary clauses and many other complications.

The meanings of other categories of expressions are either similarly function applications, or higher-order functions. The following are the rules of the grammar, with
the first column indicating a non-terminal symbol, the second column one possible
way of producing that non-terminal from other non-terminals and terminals,
and the third column indicating the corresponding meaning.

Here are example expressions and their associated meaning, according to the above grammar, showing that the meaning of a given sentence is formed from its constituent
expressions, either by forming a new higher-order function, or by applying
a higher-order function for one expression to the meaning of another.

The following are other examples of sentences translated into the predicate logic by the grammar.

In popular culture
In David Foster Wallace's novel Infinite Jest, the protagonist Hal Incandenza has written an essay entitled Montague Grammar and the Semantics of Physical Modality. Montague grammar is also referenced explicitly and implicitly several times throughout the book.

See also

References

Further reading
 Richmond Thomason (ed.): Formal Philosophy. Selected Papers by Richard Montague. New Haven, 1974, 
 Paul Portner, Barbara H. Partee (eds.): Formal Semantics: The Essential Readings, Blackwell, 2002. 
 D. R. Dowty, R.E. Wall and S. Peters: Introduction to Montague Semantics. Kluwer Academic Publishers, 1981, 
 Emmon Bach: Informal Lectures on Formal Semantics. SUNY Press, 1989, 
 B. H. Partee, A.G.B. ter Meulen and R.E. Wall: Mathematical Methods in Linguistics. Kluwer Academic Publishers, 1990, 
 B. H. Partee with Herman Hendriks: Montague Grammar. In: Handbook of Logic and Language, eds. J.F.A.K. van Benthem and A. G. B. ter Meulen Elsevier/MIT Press, 1997, pp. 5–92. 
 Reinhard Muskens Type-logical Semantics to appear in the Routledge Encyclopedia of Philosophy Online (contains an annotated bibliography).

External links
 A Free Montague Parser in a non-deterministic extension of Common Lisp.
 Montague Grammar in historical context. / The theory and the substance of Montague grammar. Central principles. / Further developments and controversies. by Barbara H. Partee.

Grammar
Semantics
Formal languages
Lambda calculus